The Battle of Incheon, also spelled Battle of Inchon, was an amphibious invasion and a battle of the Korean War that resulted in a decisive victory and strategic reversal in favor of the United Nations Command (UN). The operation involved some 75,000 troops and 261 naval vessels and led to the recapture of the South Korean capital of Seoul two weeks later. The code name for the operation was Operation Chromite.

The battle began on 15 September 1950 and ended on 19 September. Through a surprise amphibious assault far from the Pusan Perimeter that UN and Republic of Korea Army (ROK) forces were desperately defending, the largely undefended city of Incheon was secured after being bombed by UN forces. The battle ended a string of victories by the North Korean Korean People's Army (KPA). The subsequent UN recapture of Seoul partially severed the KPA's supply lines in South Korea.

The UN and ROK forces were commanded by General of the Army Douglas MacArthur of the United States Army. MacArthur was the driving force behind the operation, overcoming the strong misgivings of more cautious generals to a risky assault over extremely unfavorable terrain. The battle was followed by a rapid collapse of the KPA; within a month of the Incheon landing, the Americans had taken 135,000 KPA troops prisoner.

Background

Pusan Perimeter

From the outbreak of the Korean War following the invasion of South Korea by North Korea on 25 June 1950, the KPA had enjoyed superiority in both manpower and ground combat equipment over the ROK and UN forces dispatched to South Korea to prevent it from collapsing. The North Korean strategy was to aggressively pursue UN and ROK forces on all avenues of approach south and to engage them, attacking from the front and initiating a double envelopment of both flanks of the defending units, which allowed the KPA to surround and cut off the opposing force, forcing it to retreat in disarray. From their initial 25 June offensive to fighting in July and early August, the KPA used this tactic to defeat the UN forces they encountered and push southward. However, with the establishment of the Pusan Perimeter in August, UN forces held a continuous line which the KPA could not flank. The KPA advantages in numbers decreased daily as the superior UN logistical system brought in more troops and supplies to the UN forces.

When the KPA approached the Pusan Perimeter on 5 August, they attempted the same frontal assault technique on the four main avenues of approach into the perimeter. Throughout August, they conducted direct assaults resulting in the Battle of Masan, the Battle of Battle Mountain, the First Battle of Naktong Bulge, the Battle of Taegu, and the Battle of the Bowling Alley. On the east coast of the Korean Peninsula, the ROK repulsed three KPA divisions at the Battle of P'ohang-dong. The KPA attacks stalled as UN forces repelled the attack. All along the front, the KPA reeled from these defeats, the first time in the war North Korean tactics had failed.

By the end of August the KPA had been pushed beyond their limits and many of the original units were at far reduced strength and effectiveness. Logistic problems wracked the KPA, and shortages of food, weapons, equipment and replacement soldiers proved devastating for their units. However, the KPA retained high morale and enough supply to allow for another large-scale offensive. On 1 September the KPA threw their entire military into one final bid to break the Pusan Perimeter, the Great Naktong Offensive, a five-pronged simultaneous attack across the entire perimeter. The attack caught UN forces by surprise and almost overwhelmed them. KPA troops attacked Kyongju, surrounded Taegu and Ka-san, recrossed the Naktong Bulge, threatened Yongsan, and continued their attack at Masan, focusing on Nam River and Haman. However, despite their efforts, in one of the most brutal fights of the Korean War, the KPA were unsuccessful. Unable to hold their gains, the KPA retreated from the offensive a much weaker force, and vulnerable to counterattack.

Planning

Days after the beginning of the war, General of the Army Douglas MacArthur, the US Army officer in command of all UN forces in Korea, envisioned an amphibious assault to retake the Seoul area. The city had fallen in the first days of the war in the First Battle of Seoul. MacArthur later wrote that he thought the KPA would push the ROK back far past Seoul. He also said he decided days after the war began that the battered, demoralized, and under-equipped ROK, many of whom did not support the South Korean government put in power by the United States, could not hold off the KPA even with American support. MacArthur felt that he could turn the tide if he made a decisive troop movement behind KPA lines, and preferred Incheon, over Chumunjin-up or Kunsan as the landing site. He had originally envisioned such a landing, code-named Operation Bluehearts, for 22 July, with the US Army's 1st Cavalry Division landing at Incheon. However, by 10 July the plan was abandoned as it was clear the 1st Cavalry Division would be needed on the Pusan Perimeter. On 23 July, MacArthur formulated a new plan, code-named Operation Chromite, calling for an amphibious assault by the US Army's 2nd Infantry Division and the United States Marine Corps (USMC)'s 5th Marine Regiment in mid-September 1950. This, too fell through as both units were moved to the Pusan Perimeter. MacArthur decided instead to use the US Army's 7th Infantry Division, his last reserve unit in East Asia, to conduct the operation as soon as it could be raised to wartime strength.

In preparation for the invasion, MacArthur activated the US Army's X Corps to act as the command for the landing forces, and appointed Major General Edward Almond, his chief of staff, as Corps' commander, anticipating the operation would mean a quick end to the war. Throughout August, MacArthur faced the challenge of re-equipping the 7th Infantry Division as it had sent 9,000 of its men to reinforce the Pusan Perimeter and was far understrength. He also faced the challenge that the USMC, reduced in size following World War II, had to rebuild the 1st Marine Division, using elements of the 1st Provisional Marine Brigade fighting at Pusan as well as the 1st Marine Regiment and the 7th Marine Regiment, which pulled US Marines from as far away as the Mediterranean Sea to Korea for the task. MacArthur ordered Korean Augmentation To the United States Army (KATUSA) troops, ROK conscripts assigned to US Army units, to reinforce the 7th Infantry Division, while allocating all equipment coming into Korea to X Corps, despite it being crucially needed by the US Army's Eighth Army on the Pusan Perimeter.

MacArthur decided to use the Joint Strategic and Operations Group (JSPOG) of his United States Far East Command (FECOM). The initial plan was met with skepticism by the other generals because Incheon's natural and artificial defenses were formidable. The approaches to Incheon were two restricted passages, which could be easily blocked by naval mines. The current of the channels was also dangerously quick——and tides were so extreme as to prevent immediate follow-on landings. Finally, the anchorage was small and the harbor was surrounded by tall seawalls. United States Navy Commander Arlie G. Capps noted that the harbor had "every natural and geographic handicap." US Navy leaders favored a landing at Kunsan, closer to the Pusan perimeter and the KPA main axis of supply through Taejon, but MacArthur did not think landing there would produce a sufficiently decisive victory. He also felt that the KPA, who also thought the conditions of the Incheon channel would make a landing impossible, would be surprised and caught off-guard by the attack.

On 23 August, the commanders held a meeting at MacArthur's headquarters in Tokyo. Chief of Staff of the United States Army General Joseph Lawton Collins, Chief of Naval Operations Admiral Forrest Sherman, and United States Air Force (USAF) operations deputy Lieutenant General Idwal H. Edward all flew from Washington, D.C., to Japan to take part in the briefing; Chief of Staff of the United States Air Force General Hoyt Vandenberg did not attend, possibly because he "did not want to legitimize an operation that essentially belong[ed] to the Navy and the Marines." The Marine Corps staff, who were to be responsible for leading the landing at Incheon, were not invited, which became a contentious issue. During the briefing, nine members of the staff of US Navy Admiral James H. Doyle spoke for nearly 90 minutes on every technical and military aspect of the landing. MacArthur told the officers that although a landing at Kunsan would bring a relatively easy linkup with the Eighth Army, it "would be an attempted envelopment that would not envelop" and would place more troops in a vulnerable pocket of the Pusan Perimeter. MacArthur won over Sherman by speaking of his affection for the US Navy and relating the story of how the Navy carried him out of Corregidor to safety in 1942 during World War II. Sherman agreed to support the Incheon operation, leaving Doyle furious.

MacArthur spent 45 minutes after the briefing explaining his reasons for choosing Incheon. He said that, because it was so heavily defended, the North Koreans would not expect an attack there, that victory at Incheon would avoid a brutal winter campaign, and that, by invading a northern strong point, UN forces could cut off KPA lines of supply and communication. Sherman and Collins returned to Washington, D.C., and reported back to Secretary of Defense Louis A. Johnson. The Joint Chiefs of Staff approved MacArthur's plan on 28 August. President Truman also provided his approval.

The landing at Incheon was not the first large-scale amphibious operation since World War II. That distinction belonged to the United Nations landing that took place on 18 July 1950 at Pohang, South Korea. However, that operation was not made in KPA-held territory and was unopposed.

Admiral Struble's Joint Task Force 7 consisted of Fast Carrier Task Force 77 for fighter cover, interdiction, and ground attack; Admiral Andrewes' Blockade and Covering Task Force 91; Rear Admiral George R. Henderson's Patrol and Reconnaissance Task Force 99; Captain Bernard L. Austin's Service Squadron 3, operating as Task Force 79; Admiral Doyle's invasion force, Attack Task Force 90; and the Military Sea Transportation Service, which was to bring in the United States Army's 7th Infantry Division on 18 September 1950.

Prelude
Before the main land battle, UN forces landed spies in Incheon and bombarded the city's defenses via air and sea. Deception operations were also carried out to draw North Korean attention away from Incheon.

Maintaining surprise

With men, supplies, and ships obviously concentrating at Pusan and in Japanese ports for a major amphibious operation and the press in Japan referring to the upcoming landings as "Operation Common Knowledge," the UN command feared that it would fail to achieve surprise in the Incheon landings. Exacerbating this fear, the leader of a North Korean-Japanese spy ring arrested in Japan in early September 1950 had a copy of the plan for Operation Chromite, and the UN forces did not know whether he had managed to transmit the plan to North Korea before his arrest. US Navy patrol aircraft, surface warships, and submarines operated in the Sea of Japan (East Sea) and the Yellow Sea to detect any reaction by North Korean, Soviet, or People's Republic of China military forces, and on 4 September 1950 F4U Corsair fighters of Fighter Squadron 53 (VF-53) operating from the aircraft carrier  shot down a Soviet Air Force A-20 Havoc bomber after it opened fire on them over the Yellow Sea as it flew toward the UN naval task force there.

In order to ensure surprise during the landings, UN forces staged an elaborate deception operation to draw North Korean attention away from Incheon by making it appear that the landing would take place  to the south at Kunsan. On 5 September 1950, aircraft of the USAF's Far East Air Forces began attacks on roads and bridges to isolate Kunsan, typical of the kind of raids expected prior to an invasion there. A naval bombardment of Kunsan followed on 6 September, and on 11 September USAF B-29 Superfortress bombers joined the aerial campaign, bombing military installations in the area.

In addition to aerial and naval bombardment, UN forces took other measures to focus North Korean attention on Kunsan. On the docks at Pusan, USMC officers briefed their men on an upcoming landing at Kunsan within earshot of many Koreans, and on the night of 12–13 September 1950 the Royal Navy frigate  landed US Army special operations troops and Royal Marine Commandos on the docks at Kunsan, making sure that North Korean forces noticed their visit.

UN forces conducted a series of drills, tests, and raids elsewhere on the coast of Korea, where conditions were similar to Incheon, before the actual invasion. These drills were used to perfect the timing and performance of the landing craft, but also were intended to confuse the North Koreans further as to the location of the invasion.

Incheon infiltration

Fourteen days before the landing at Incheon, a UN reconnaissance team (KLO Unit) landed in Incheon Harbor to obtain information on the conditions there. The team, led by US Navy Lieutenant Eugene F. Clark, landed at Yonghung-do, an island in the mouth of the harbor. From there, the team relayed intelligence back to the UN Command. With the help of locals, Clark gathered information about tides, beach composition, mudflats, and seawalls. A separate reconnaissance mission codenamed Trudy Jackson, which dispatched Lieutenant Youn Joung of the Republic of Korea Navy and ROK Colonel Ke In-Ju to Incheon to collect further intelligence on the area, was mounted by the US military.

Clark observed the tides at Incheon for two weeks and discovered that American tidal charts were inaccurate, but that Japanese charts were quite good. Clark's team provided detailed reports on KPA artillery positions and fortifications on the island of Wolmido, at Incheon and on nearby islands. During the extended periods of low tide, Clark's team located and removed some North Korean naval mines, but, critically to the future success of the invasion, Clark reported that the North Koreans had not in fact systematically mined the channels.

When the KPA discovered that the agents had landed on the islands near Incheon, they made multiple attacks, including an attempted raid on Yonghung-do with six junks. Clark mounted a machine gun on a sampan and sank the attacking junks. In response, the KPA killed perhaps as many as 50 civilians for helping Clark.

Bombardments of Wolmido and Incheon

On 10 September 1950, five days before the Incheon landing, 43 American warplanes flew over Wolmido, dropping 93 napalm canisters to "burn out" its eastern slope in an attempt to clear the way for American troops.

The flotilla of ships that landed and supported the amphibious force during the battle was commanded by Vice Admiral Arthur D. Struble, an expert in amphibious warfare. Struble had participated in amphibious operations in World War II, including the Normandy landings and the Battle of Leyte. He got underway for Incheon in his flagship, the heavy cruiser , on 12 September 1950.
Royal Canadian Navy destroyers ,  and  also participated in the invasion task force.

At 07:00 on 13 September, the U.S. Navy's Destroyer Squadron 9, headed by Mansfield, steamed up Flying Fish Channel and into Incheon Harbor, where it fired upon KPA gun emplacements on Wolmido and in Incheon. Between them, two British cruisers and six American destroyers fired almost a thousand 5-inch (127-mm) and 6-inch (152-mm) shells onto the fortifications. The attacks tipped off the KPA that a landing might be imminent, and the KPA officer in command on Wolmido assured his superiors that he would throw their enemies back into the sea. North Korea's 918th Coastal Artillery Regiment returned fire, hitting Collett seven times, Gurke three times, and Lyman K. Swenson twice. Aboard Lyman K. Swenson, Lieutenant (junior grade) David H. Swenson was killed and eight others were wounded.

The American destroyers withdrew after bombarding Wolmido for an hour and Rochester, Toledo, Jamaica, and Kenya proceeded to bombard the KPA batteries for the next three hours from the south of the island. Lieutenant Clark and his South Korean squad watched from hills south of Incheon, plotting locations where KPA machine guns were firing at the flotilla. They relayed this information to the invasion force via Japan in the afternoon.

During the night of 13–14 September, Struble decided on another day of bombardment, and the destroyers moved back up the channel off Wolmido on 14 September. They and the cruisers bombarded the island again that day, and planes from the carrier task force bombed and strafed it.

At 00:50 on 15 September 1950, Lieutenant Clark and his South Korean squad activated the lighthouse on the island of Palmido. Later that morning, the ships carrying the amphibious force followed the destroyers toward Incheon and entered Flying Fish Channel, and the US Marines of the invasion force got ready to make the first landings on Wolmido.

Naval mine clearance
Within weeks of the outbreak of the Korean War, the Soviet Union had shipped naval mines to North Korea for use in coastal defense, with Soviet naval mine warfare experts providing technical instruction in laying and employment of the mines to North Korean personnel. Some of the mines were shipped to Incheon. The UN forces did not become aware of the presence of mines in North Korean waters until early September 1950, raising fears that this would interfere with the Incheon invasion. It was too late to reschedule the landings, but the North Koreans laid relatively few and unsophisticated mines at Incheon. Destroyers in the assault force visually identified moored contact mines in the channel at low tide and destroyed them with gunfire. When the invasion force passed through the channel at high tide to land on the assault beaches, it passed over any remaining mines without incident.

Battle

Green Beach

At 06:30 on September 15, 1950, the lead elements of X Corps hit "Green Beach" on the northern side of Wolmido. The landing force consisted of the 3rd Battalion, 5th Marines, led by Lieutenant Colonel Robert Taplett and nine M26 Pershing tanks from the USMC 1st Tank Battalion. One tank was equipped with a flamethrower and two others had bulldozer blades. The battle group landed from tank landing ships (LSTs). The entire island was captured by noon at the cost of just 14 casualties.

The KPA defenders were outnumbered by more than six to one by the UN troops. KPA casualties included over 200 killed and 136 captured, primarily from the 918th Artillery Regiment and the 226th Independent Marine Regiment. The forces on Green Beach had to wait until 19:50 for the tide to rise, allowing another group to land. During this time, extensive shelling and bombing, along with anti-tank mines placed on the only bridge, kept the small KPA force from launching a significant counterattack. The second wave came ashore at "Red Beach" and "Blue Beach".

The North Koreans had not been expecting an invasion at Incheon. After the storming of Green Beach, the KPA assumed (probably because of deliberate American disinformation) that the main invasion would happen at Kunsan. As a result, only a small force was diverted to Incheon. Even those forces were too late, and they arrived after the UN forces had taken Blue Beach and Red Beach. The troops already stationed at Incheon had been weakened by Clark's guerrillas, and napalm bombing runs had destroyed key ammunition dumps. In total, 261 ships took part.

For Red Beach and Blue Beach, Vice Admiral James H. Doyle, Commander of an amphibious ready group, announced that H-Hour, time of landing, would be 17:30.

The KPA 22nd Infantry Regiment had moved to Incheon before dawn on September 15, 1950, but retreated to Seoul after the main landing that evening.

Red Beach

The Red Beach forces, made up of the Regimental Combat Team 5, which included the 3rd Battalion of the Republic of Korea Marine Corps (ROKMC), used ladders to scale the sea walls. (See Map) The 1st Battalion, 5th Marines would be on the left, against Cemetery Hill and northern half of Observatory Hill. The 2nd Battalion, 5th Marines would take the southern half of Observatory Hill and Inner Basin.

Late on the afternoon of September 15, the LSTs approached Red Beach and as the lead ships, they came under heavy mortar and machine gun fire from KPA defenders on Cemetery Hill. Despite the concentrated fire, they disembarked assault troops and unloaded vital support equipment. In addition, their guns wiped out KPA batteries on the right flank of Red Beach. Three (and LST 973) of the eight LSTs took some hits from mortar and machine gun fire, which killed a sailor and injured a few others. The LSTs completed unloading and cleared the beach at high tide early on 16 September.

After neutralizing KPA defenses at Incheon on the night of September 15, units from Red Beach opened the causeway to Wolmi-do, allowing the 3rd Battalion, 5th Marines and the tanks from Green Beach to enter the battle for Incheon.

Blue Beach
Their mission, once the beach was secure, was to capture the suburb of Yongdungpo, cross the Han River, and form the right flank of the attack on Seoul itself. As the 1st Marine Regiment approached the coast, the combined fire from several KPA gun emplacements sank one LST. Destroyer fire and bombing runs silenced the KPA defenses. When the Blue Beach forces finally arrived, the KPA forces at Incheon had already surrendered, so they met little opposition and suffered few additional casualties. The 1st Marine Regiment spent much of its time strengthening the beachhead and preparing for the move inland.

Immediately after KPA resistance was extinguished in Incheon, the supply and reinforcement process began. Seabees and Underwater Demolition Teams (UDTs) that had arrived with the US Marines constructed a pontoon dock on Green Beach and cleared debris from the water. The dock was then used to unload the remainder of the LSTs. Early that morning of September 16, Lieutenant Colonel Murray and Colonel Puller had their operational orders from 1st Marine Division commander General Oliver P. Smith. The 1st Marines and 5th Marines began moving along the Incheon-Seoul road.

Early morning on September 16, the 5th Marines (from Red and Green Beaches) started generally east along the Incheon-Seoul road, intending to link up with the left of the 1st Marine Regiment so both regiments could move on Seoul. Six solitary T-34 tanks moving west towards Incheon appeared as the advancing 5th Marines reached the village of Kansong-ni. A strike force of eight Marine F4U Corsairs from VMF-214 attacked the tanks, destroying two and driving the others off. M26 Pershing tanks of the 1st Tank Battalion destroyed three more KPA tanks shortly thereafter. South of the 5th Marines, the 1st Marines, having spent most of the day consolidating its scattered units, did not move east until about 16:00 hrs.

Just before dawn on September 17, two companies of the 5th Marines, supported by artillery and M26 tanks, defeated a counterattack by a column of six T-34 tanks and two hundred infantry, inflicting heavy casualties.

Air attack on USS Rochester and HMS Jamaica
Just before daylight at 05:50 on 17 September, two Soviet-made North Korean aircraft—probably Yakovlev Yak-9s—were seen overhead from Jamaica, and while trying to identify them any doubts about their allegiance and intentions were resolved by the explosion of a bomb close to the port side of Rochester. Four bombs were dropped, one hitting and denting Rochester's crane but not exploding. There were no American casualties. As the aircraft turned away Jamaica opened fire with her port 4-inch battery on the leading aircraft. The second aircraft then turned to port to strafe Jamaica, scoring several hits: one armor-piercing round entering Y turret through the armor at the back of the gun house and wounding a man in the leg; one chipping the side armor of the ship; one exploding round burst on the plate surrounding the loaders of a quadruple pom-pom, wounding three men (one of whom died later of his wounds after being transferred to the hospital ship ); and one on the foremast at the level of the gun direction platform, scattering small splinters. Every close range weapon available opened fire on this aircraft, which disintegrated as it went over the ship, crashing close to the starboard side of Jamaica.

Breakthrough

Kimpo Airfield
The 2nd Battalion, 5th Marines flared off to the left (north) on September 17 to secure Kimpo airfield, west of Seoul.
 Kimpo airfield was the largest and most important in Korea. On September 17, General MacArthur was extremely urgent in his request for the early capture of Kimpo airfield. Once it was secured, the Fifth Air Force and USMC aviation units could bring fighters and bombers over from Japan to operate more easily against North Korea. The attack on Kimpo airfield was carried out by 2nd Battalion 5th Marines. The night of September 17–18 at Kimpo, the KPA unsuccessfully attempted to recapture Kimpo with those forces that had not already fled across the Han River, under the command of Brigadier General Wan Yong (the commander of the North Korean Air Force). The counterattacks were repelled by entrenched Marine Corps infantry, armor and artillery.

By morning the North Koreans were all gone, and Kimpo airfield was securely in the hands of the Marines. Kimpo airfield was in excellent shape; the North Koreans had not had time to do any major demolition. In fact, several North Korean planes were still on the field. Kimpo would now become the center of UN land-based air operations.

After the capture of Kimpo airfield, transport planes began flying in gasoline and ordnance for the aircraft stationed there. The Marines continued unloading supplies and reinforcements. By September 22, they had unloaded 6,629 vehicles and 53,882 troops, along with 25,512 tons (23,000 tonnes) of supplies.

Battle of Seoul

In contrast to the quick victory at Incheon, the advance on Seoul was slow and bloody. The KPA launched another T-34 attack, which was trapped and destroyed, and a Yak bombing run in Incheon harbor, which did little damage. The KPA attempted to stall the UN offensive to allow time to reinforce Seoul and withdraw troops from the south. Although warned that the process of taking Seoul would allow remaining KPA forces in the south to escape, MacArthur felt that he was bound to honor promises given to the South Korean government to retake the capital as soon as possible.

On the second day, vessels carrying the 7th Infantry Division arrived in Incheon Harbor. Almond was eager to get the division into position to block a possible KPA movement from the south of Seoul. On the morning of September 18, the division's 2nd Battalion, 32nd Infantry Regiment landed at Incheon and the remainder of the regiment went ashore later in the day. The next morning, the 2nd Battalion moved up to relieve a Marine battalion occupying positions on the right flank south of Seoul. Meanwhile, the 7th Division's 31st Infantry Regiment came ashore at Incheon. Responsibility for the zone south of Seoul highway passed to the 7th Division at 18:00 on September 19. The 7th Infantry Division then engaged in heavy fighting with KPA forces on the outskirts of Seoul.

Before the battle, North Korea had just one understrength division in the city, with the majority of its forces south of the capital. MacArthur personally oversaw the 1st Marine Regiment as it fought through KPA positions on the road to Seoul. Control of Operation Chromite was then given to Almond, the X Corps commander. Almond was in an enormous hurry to capture Seoul by September 25, exactly three months after the North Korean assault across the 38th Parallel. On September 22, the Marines entered Seoul to find it fortified. Casualties mounted as the forces engaged in house-to-house fighting. On September 26, the Hotel Bando (which had served as the US Embassy) was cleared by E Company of 2nd Battalion, 1st Marines. During this fight several Marines were wounded.

Almond declared Seoul liberated the evening of September 25, a claim repeated by MacArthur the following day. However, at the time of Almond's declaration, US Marines were still engaged in house-to-house combat as the KPA remained in most of the city. It was not until September 28 that the last of the KPA elements were driven out or destroyed.

Pusan Perimeter breakout

While the 5th Marines came ashore at Incheon, the last KPA troops in South Korea still fighting were defeated when Walton H. Walker's Eighth Army breakout from the Pusan Perimeter started on 16 September, joining the Army's X Corps in a coordinated attack on KPA forces. By 22 September the KPA forces around the Perimeter were in full retreat and the Eighth Army and ROK forces began a full counteroffensive to pursue the KPA on 23 September. Of the 70,000 KPA troops around Pusan, in the aftermath of the Pusan Perimeter battle, KPA casualties from September 1 to September 15 ranged from 36,000 to 41,000 killed and captured, with an unknown total number of wounded. However, because UN forces had concentrated on taking Seoul rather than cutting off the KPA's withdrawal north, the remaining 30,000 KPA soldiers escaped to the north, where they were soon reconstituted as a cadre for the formation of new KPA divisions hastily re-equipped by the Soviet Union. The UN assault continued into North Korea on 30 September.

Analysis
Most military scholars consider the battle one of the most decisive military operations in modern warfare. Spencer C. Tucker, the American military historian, described the Incheon landings as "a brilliant success, almost flawlessly executed," which remained "the only unambiguously successful, large-scale US combat operation" for the next 40 years. Commentators have described the Incheon operation as MacArthur's "greatest success" and "an example of brilliant generalship and military genius."

However, Russell Stolfi argues that the landing itself was a strategic masterpiece but it was followed by an advance to Seoul in ground battle so slow and measured that it constituted an operational disaster, largely negating the successful landing. He contrasts the US military's 1950 Incheon-Seoul operation with the German offensive in the Baltic in 1941. By contrast, in the Baltic region in 1941 the German forces achieved strategic surprise on the first day of their offensive and then, exhibiting a breakthrough mentality, pushed forward rapidly, seizing key positions and advancing almost  in four days. The American advance was characterized by cautious, restrictive orders, concerns about phase lines, limited reconnaissance and command posts well in the rear, while the Germans positioned their leaders as far forward as possible, relied on oral or short written orders, reorganized combat groups to meet immediate circumstances, and engaged in vigorous reconnaissance. Despite this criticism, Incheon was taken within 24 hours with the loss of only a few dozen U.S. troops and General Walton Walker refused to go on the offensive in southeastern South Korea unless the Incheon landings were successful, as shown in the Pusan Perimeter Offensive.

In popular culture
 Inchon (1981), directed by  Terence Young with Laurence Olivier as General Douglas MacArthur. Unification Church founder Sun Myung Moon was an executive producer of the film.
 Wolmi Island (film) (1982) North Korean film.
 Operation Chromite (2016), directed by John H. Lee (Lee Jae-han). Starring Lee Jung-jae, Lee Beom-soo, and Liam Neeson as General MacArthur.

Notes

References

External links

 Max Hermansen (2000) "Inchon – Operation Chromite"  
 Invasions of Inchon and Wonsan remembered French and English supported operations. Allies provide a unique perspective of naval operation in the Korean War.
 

Battles and operations of the Korean War in 1950
Naval battles of the Korean War
Naval battles of the Korean War involving the United States
Events in Incheon
Battles of the Korean War
United States Marine Corps in the Korean War
Battles of the Korean War involving the United States
Naval battles of the Korean War involving Canada
Landing operations
September 1950 events in Asia
Amphibious operations involving the United States
Battles of the Korean War involving South Korea
Battles of the Korean War involving North Korea